Nicholas Albert Reale (March 20, 1922 – November 18, 1984) was a prominent American watercolorist with a lengthy career in art and teaching. Reale's works have been exhibited throughout the United States and Canada, including the Metropolitan Museum of Art. The recipient of more than 60 major awards, he is listed in Who's Who in American Art. His works are in the permanent collections of the National Academy of Design, Newark Museum NJ, the Jersey City Museum, the University of Arizona, and Monmouth University.

Born in Irvington, New Jersey, his parents emigrated from southern Italy in the early 20th century, and Reale attended Newark Arts High School in Newark, New Jersey, where he eventually joined the faculty.  He was directed to the Arts High School by a biology teacher in the public schools, who had noticed his exceptional sketches in the margins of his science assignments and encouraged him to transfer schools. Upon graduation Reale enrolled in the Pratt Institute, Brooklyn.

Reale served in the United States Navy for the entirety of World War II, returning to complete his degree. Upon graduation from Pratt he became a successful commercial artist in Manhattan, married Maria Padula, his wife of 35 years, and settled in Hillside, New Jersey, with summers in Belmar, New Jersey. They had three children who survive them:  Nancy Reale Gifford-Humphreys,  Aldo Reale, and Barbara Reale, and seven grandchildren.

In 1968, Reale left the commercial art world and spent the rest of his life painting and teaching.  He was an influential instructor in painting and graphic design, teaching at Seton Hall University, the Newark School of Fine and Industrial Arts, Somerset Art Association,  Princeton Art Association
, Summit Arts Center, and Morris County Art Association. He also led workshops nationally.
Reale was an active associate member of the American Watercolor Society,  a member of Allied Artists of America, of Audubon Artists and the New Jersey Watercolor Society. The NJ Watercolor Society named him Artist of the Year in 1969.  In 1981 he was named an Associate National Academician by the National Academy.
  
Reale's work explored and overlapped several styles and palettes, with impressionistic and abstract styles predominant; seascapes were his forte. All of his known paintings have a small patch of bright red, which is usually the focal point of the composition; this became his trademark. He was influenced by the work of French impressionist and cubist Georges Braque. Reale died suddenly and unexpectedly at age 62, during the opening days of a one-man exhibit at Gallery 9, Chatham, New Jersey.
Reale's work and teaching have influenced many artists, including Alice de Caprio, the Aquamedia Group (ten women who were his students), Beth Born, Diana Patton, Patricia Tindall Sally Vaughan, and Ellen Vreeland.

The American Watercolor Society continues to present the Nicholas Reale Memorial Award in his honor

Major awards

 American Watercolor Society- The Arches Papers Award (1972); The High Winds Medal (1976),   The Doris Olsen Klep Memorial Award (1981)
 New Jersey Watercolor Society Silver Medal of Honor awarded in 1971 (for ‘Mending nets in Nazare’) and 1982 (for ‘Homage to Henry’) 
 Grumbacher Award at the New Jersey Watercolor Society, 1981 (for "Warm Passage")

References 

1922 births
1984 deaths
United States Navy personnel of World War II
American watercolorists
Artists from New Jersey
Newark Arts High School alumni
People from Hillside, New Jersey
People from Irvington, New Jersey
People from Newark, New Jersey
Pratt Institute alumni
Seton Hall University faculty
American people of Italian descent